Sarmad Salih Rasheed  (born 1 January 1982 in Baghdad, Iraq) is an Iraqi football goalkeeper. He played for the Iraq national football team in 2005 and plays for Baghdad FC in Iraq.

External links
 Profile on Goalzz.com

1982 births
Iraqi footballers
Sportspeople from Baghdad
Living people
Al-Zawraa SC players
Amanat Baghdad players
Association football goalkeepers
Iraq international footballers